Valentin Dimian Maftei (born 26 September 1974 in Săgeata) is a Romanian former rugby union player. He played as a fullback.

Club career
During his career, Maftei played for Universitatea Cluj in Romania, Mirano in Italy and for Aurillac, Figeac and Mauriac, all in France.

International career
Maftei gathered 42 caps for Romania, from his debut in 1995 to his last game in 2006. He scored 7 tries, 3 conversions and one drop-goal, 44 points on aggregate. He was a member of his national side for the 6th Rugby World Cup in 2003, where he played four matches in Pool A against Ireland, Wallabies, Argentina and Namibia and scored one try against Ireland.

References

External links
 
 
 

1974 births
Living people
Romanian rugby union players
Romania international rugby union players
Rugby union fullbacks
CS Universitatea Cluj-Napoca (rugby union) players
People from Buzău County
Expatriate rugby union players in Italy
Expatriate rugby union players in France
Romanian expatriate sportspeople in France